Hazel Cheadle (nee Austin; 8 November 1922 — 8 March 1999) was a British field hockey and tennis player.

Cheadle, raised in Hampshire, developed an interest in tennis while acting as a ball girl for her parents. Her father was headmaster of Milford School.

Based in Birmingham, Cheadle was a Warwickshire representative player and won the county singles title nine times in a row. She made the singles fourth round of the 1953 Wimbledon Championships.

During the 1960s she played international matches for the England national field hockey team.

References

1922 births
1999 deaths
British female tennis players
English female tennis players
English female field hockey players
Tennis people from Hampshire